Joseph Schrage (November 12, 1818 - January 4, 1892) was an American farmer, innkeeper, saloonkeeper, dry goods merchant, grocer, keeper of a livery stable and banker from Sheboygan, Wisconsin who held office in the Wisconsin State Assembly in 1856; as a sheriff; and as a city treasurer, and alderman. He was a Republican. He was born near Olpe, Westphalia, Kingdom of Prussia. In 1842, Schrage emigranted to the United States and eventually settled in Sheboygan, Wisconsin where he started a grocery business. He also started 'The Wisconsin House' for entertainment.

References

Businesspeople from Wisconsin
Politicians from Sheboygan, Wisconsin
People from Olpe (district)
Prussian emigrants to the United States
Wisconsin city council members
Wisconsin sheriffs
1818 births
1892 deaths
19th-century American politicians
19th-century American businesspeople
Republican Party members of the Wisconsin State Assembly